Scherhorn may refer to:
 Gerhard Scherhorn (1930–2018), German economist
 Operation Scherhorn, World War II intelligence operation by the USSR

See also
Scharhörn, a small island in the Heligoland Bight near Cuxhaven, Germany
Schärhorn, a mountain in the Glarus Alps near Klausen Pass, Switzerland